Tartakover or Tartakower is a gender-neutral Jewish surname. It is related to the surname Tartakovsky, both meaning "from ".

People with the surname include:
Aryeh Tartakower (1897–1982), Polish-born Israeli political activist, historian and sociologist
David Tartakover (born 1944), Israeli graphic designer and political activist
Savielly Tartakower (1887–1956), Polish and French chess grandmaster
Theodore Tartakover (1887–1977), Australian swimmer

Jewish surnames